Rhubarb Le Restaurant is a restaurant in Singapore serving French cuisine and wine. The restaurant is a joint venture between manager Jerome Desfonds and chef de cuisine Paul Longworth.

The restaurant has been featured in various local publications such as The Straits Times, SG Magazine, Today and Time Out magazine. Their signature dish is the pigeon with rhubarb and rose purée.

Awards 
The restaurant has retained one star since the Michelin Guide's inaugural 2016 Singapore edition.

See also 
 List of Michelin starred restaurants in Singapore
 List of restaurants in Singapore

References 

Michelin Guide starred restaurants in Singapore
French restaurants in Singapore